This is a list of monster movies, about such creatures as extraterrestrial aliens, giant animals, Kaiju (the Japanese counterpart of giant animals, but they can also be machines and plants), mutants, supernatural creatures, or creatures from folklore, such as Bigfoot or the Loch Ness Monster. These movies usually fall into the science fiction, fantasy and/or horror genres.

See also
 List of films featuring giant monsters

References

Bibliography 
 

 
Lists of horror films